McKillip is a surname. Notable people with the surname include:

 Britt McKillip (born 1991), Canadian actress and singer
 Carly McKillip (born 1989), Canadian actress and musician
 Patricia A. McKillip (1948–2022), American author

See also
 McKillop (surname)